Ivo Minář chose to not defend his 2008 title.
Lu Yen-hsun defeated Igor Sijsling 6–2, 6–3 in the final match.

Seeds

Draw

Finals

Top half

Bottom half

References
 Main Draw
 Qualifying Draw

Flea Market Cup - Singles